The 1986 World Sports-Prototype Championship season was the 34th season of FIA "World Sportscar Championship" motor racing.  It featured the 1986 FIA World Sports Prototype Championship which was contested over a nine race series that ran from 20 April to 5 October 1986. The championship was open to Group C Sports Prototypes, Group C2 Sports Prototypes and IMSA GTP cars. The Drivers Championship was won by Derek Bell and the Teams Championship by Brun Motorsport.

Schedule
The 1986 FIA World Sports Prototype Championship was contested over a nine race series.

† - Race counted for Drivers Championship but not for Teams Championship.

Entries

Group C1

Group C2

Season results

Points were awarded to the top 10 finishers in the order of 20-15-12-10-8-6-4-3-2-1, with the following exceptions: 
 Drivers failing to drive the car within a certain percentage of the laps in a race were not given points.
 Teams were only given points for their highest finishing car with no point awarded for positions filled by additional cars. Drivers Championship points were still awarded to the drivers of these cars.
 Neither driver nor teams scored points if they did not complete 90% of the winner's distance.

Races

Results

Drivers Championship
The Drivers Championship was awarded to Derek Bell, who drove a Porsche. Bell and Hans-Joachim Stuck both scored 82 championship points, however Bell was declared champion as he finished in a higher placing than Stuck at the Norisring round, the only event at which they did not compete together.

FIA Cup for Group C2 Drivers
The FIA Cup for Group C2 Drivers was awarded jointly to Raymond Bellim and Gordon Spice, who shared an Ecosse.

Teams Championship
All cars were eligible to score points towards the Teams Championship, and Group C2 cars were also eligible to score points for the FIA Cup for C2 Teams.

No Teams Championship points were awarded for Rounds 1, 4, 5, and 6.

FIA Cup for Group C2 Teams

References

External links
 World Sportscar Championship, www.classicscars.com

 
World Sportscar Championship seasons
Sports